Rikard Bergh and Trevor Kronemann won the title, defeating Javier Frana and Leonardo Lavalle in the final.

Seeds
Champion seeds are indicated in bold text while text in italics indicates the round in which those seeds were eliminated.

  Steve DeVries /  Jacco Eltingh (first round)
  Mike Briggs /  Brent Haygarth (first round)
  Jim Pugh /  Greg Van Emburgh (quarterfinals)
  Luke Jensen /  Murphy Jensen (first round)

Draw

References

1993 U.S. Men's Clay Court Championships